Marivita lacus is a Gram-negative, aerobic, strictly  heterotrophic, non-endospore-forming and heterotrophic bacterium from the genus of Marivita which has been isolated from the Tuosu Lake from the Qaidam Basin in China.

References 

Rhodobacteraceae
Bacteria described in 2015